Congelation (from Latin:) was a term used in medieval and early modern alchemy for the process known today as crystallization. 

It was one of the twelve alchemical operations involved in the creation of the philosophers' stone  as described by Sir George Ripley in his Compound of Alchymy, as well as by Antoine-Joseph Pernety in his Dictionnaire mytho-hermétique (1758).

See also
Alchemical process
Magnum opus (alchemy)

References

Works cited

Alchemical processes